Thomas Galbraith Herbert House, also known as the Shealy House, is a historic home located at Batesburg-Leesville, Lexington County, South Carolina. It was built in 1878, and is a 1 1/2-half story Victorian Eclectic style dwelling.  It is sheathed in weatherboard and has a raised seam, metal, multi-gabled roof. It features a projecting front gable with a recessed balcony and a full width front porch.

It was listed on the National Register of Historic Places in 1982.

References 

Houses on the National Register of Historic Places in South Carolina
Victorian architecture in South Carolina
Houses completed in 1878
Houses in Lexington County, South Carolina
National Register of Historic Places in Lexington County, South Carolina